Trichodischia is a genus of parasitic flies in the family Tachinidae.

Species
Trichodischia caerulea Bigot, 1885
Trichodischia soror Bigot, 1885

References

Taxa named by Jacques-Marie-Frangile Bigot
Diptera of South America
Dexiinae
Tachinidae genera